PT Citilink Indonesia, operating as Citilink, is a low-cost airline headquartered in Jakarta, Indonesia. Established in July 2001 as a low-cost brand of Garuda Indonesia, it operates shuttle services between Indonesian cities. Since 30 July 2012, Citilink has officially operated as a separate subsidiary of Garuda Indonesia, operating with its own callsign, airline codes, logo and uniform. Its main base is Soekarno–Hatta International Airport and Juanda International Airport.  The company slogan is Better fly, Citilink.

History
Garuda Indonesia established Citilink as a low-cost brand in 2001 and operations commenced on 16 July that year with two Fokker F28 Fellowships transferred from the mainline fleet. Initial operations were from Surabaya on the island of Java to destinations not served by Garuda Indonesia's mainline fleet: Yogyakarta (also on Java); Balikpapan on the island of Borneo and Tarakan, North Kalimantan, just off Borneo's coast; and Makassar on the island of Sulawesi. By the end of 2001 Garuda had transferred five F28s to Citilink. In 2004 Citilink was serving ten destinations and Garuda began to replace the F28s with Boeing 737-300s. In 2008 Garuda temporarily suspended operations of Citilink, relaunching the brand in January 2009 after replacing the remaining Fokker F28s with more modern aircraft. In July 2010 Citilink operations were being conducted by two Boeing 737-300s and a Boeing 737-400.

Spinoff and expansion plans
In May 2011 Garuda announced plans for a spin-off of Citilink. The new business plan was for Citilink to become a separate business entity in the first quarter of 2012 with a full brand overhaul for the airline, including a new livery design; new website; a new cabin interior design and cabin crew uniforms; and new advertising and marketing strategies.
An integral part of this plan was for Citilink to secure 25 new Airbus A320s and utilising these new and more economical aircraft to expand into a significant regional low-cost carrier with the anticipation that by 2015, Citilink would contribute 30 percent of Garuda Indonesia's revenue.

After obtaining an Air Operator's Certificate in August 2012, Citilink had carried 8 million passengers by the end of 2013 and was running at a load factor of 85 percent and an On Time Arrival rate of 87 percent. In May 2015 the airline's fleet consisted of four Boeing 737-300s, four Boeing 737-500s and thirty-four Airbus A320s.

In late 2019, Citilink took delivery of two Airbus A330-900s originally ordered by WOW Air which are to be used for flights to Germany, Japan, and Saudi Arabia. In June 2022, both Airbus A330-900s left the Citilink fleet and were transferred to Garuda Indonesia.

Destinations 

As of March 2023, Citilink mostly serves Indonesian domestic destinations; it serves three international destinations:

Fleet

Current fleet
, Citilink operates the following aircraft:

Fleet development
On 9 August 2011, Garuda Indonesia finalised an order for 25 Airbus A320 aircraft with options for 25 more, making the airline a new customer for the Airbus single aisle aircraft type. The order consisted of 15 Airbus A320s and 10 Airbus A320neos, with five aircraft expected to be delivered each year between 2014 and 2018. The fleet upgrade program was valued at around $2.13 billion.

By late 2011, Garuda Indonesia was seeking more used A320s in preparation for the launch of proposed international Citilink services in 2012.

In December 2012, Citilink placed an order for 25 ATR 72-600s with options for 25 more. This was Citilink's first direct order to a manufacturer. A direct order for 25 additional A320neos followed in January 2013, bringing up the total order to 35.

Citilink's first A320, a second-hand aircraft, arrived in late June 2011 and entered into service on 16 September 2011, linking Jakarta with Balikpapan, Banjarmasin and Medan.

Services

Cabin
Citilink aircraft cabins have standard configuration of 180 seats. In July 2018, Citilink introduced "Green Zone" programme. Seats on the first five rows and emergency window exit rows are named green seats, while the rest are named regular seats. Passengers wanting to book or request a green seat or specific regular seat during booking or check-in will be charged for a certain fee. Additional benefits include free snacks, drinks, and insurance.

Internet in the air
On 16 January 2019, Citilink became the first low cost carrier in the Asia Pacific region to offer Wi-Fi at 35,000 feet above ground for free using GX Aviation Systems. The first flight with the connectivity feature flew flight number QG684 on the Jakarta to Denpasar route.

Accidents and incidents

Citilink Flight 800 incident
On 28 December 2016, a video taken by a passenger aboard Citilink Flight 800, a flight from Juanda International Airport in Surabaya to Soekarno-Hatta International Airport in Jakarta went viral after it purportedly showed a drunk pilot making a "bizarre announcement" before takeoff. Several passengers immediately reported the incident to the airline's headquarters. The crew of the flight quickly removed the drunk pilot from the cockpit. Due to the incident, the flight was delayed for an hour.

Citilink immediately took action by sacking the pilot involved in the incident and issuing letters of apology to affected passengers. The Indonesian Transport Ministry apologized publicly to the Indonesian people due to the incident. The ministry later added that the pilot had undergone drug testing, conducted by the Indonesian National Narcotic Agency.

Another video, captured from cameras at the airport security checkpoint, later surfaced and went viral. The video showed the drunk pilot becoming jittery and even nearly losing his balance during the security check. Police investigated the video, resulting in the Indonesian Transport Ministry sending Citilink its very first warning.

In the aftermath of the incident, the CEO of Citilink, Albert Burhan, resigned. The operational director of Citilink, Hadinoto Soedigno, also resigned in response to the incident.

See also
 List of airlines of Indonesia
 List of airports in Indonesia
 Aviation in Indonesia
 Transport in Indonesia

References

https://amp.kompas.com/money/read/2022/02/18/134500326/jadi-dirut-baru-citilink-dewa-kadek-rai-lama-berkarier-di-garuda-indonesia

External links

Official website

Airlines established in 2001
Airlines of Indonesia
Companies based in Jakarta
Garuda Indonesia
Low-cost carriers
Indonesian brands
Indonesian companies established in 2001